The 1993 SWAC men's basketball tournament was held March 11–13, 1993, at the Riverside Centroplex in Baton Rouge, Louisiana. Southern defeated , 101–80 in the championship game. The Jaguars received the conference's automatic bid to the 1992 NCAA tournament as No. 13 seed in the West Region.

Bracket and results

References

1992–93 Southwestern Athletic Conference men's basketball season
SWAC men's basketball tournament